Alienigma is the fifth album from the US speed metal band Agent Steel. The album was released by Mascot Records on August 31, 2007.

Track listing
 "Fashioned from Dust" – 4:44
 "Wash the Planet Clean" – 5:25
 "Hail to the Chief" – 6:37
 "Liberty Lying Bleeding" – 4:59
 "Hybridized" – 6:06
 "Extinct" – 3:53
 "Wormwood" – 6:08
 "W.P.D. (World Pandemic Destruction)" – 5:23
 "Tiamat's Fall" – 5:37
 "Lamb to the Slaughter" – 4:08

Personnel
 Bruce Hall – Vocals
 Juan Garcia – Guitar
 Bernie Versailles – Guitar
 Karlos Medina – Bass
 Rigo Amezcua – Drums

References

Agent Steel albums
2007 albums
Mascot Records albums